United States v. Alfonso D. Lopez, Jr., 514 U.S. 549 (1995), was a landmark case of the United States Supreme Court concerning the Commerce Clause. It was the first case since 1937 in which the Court held that Congress had exceeded its power to legislate under the Commerce Clause.

The case arose from a San Antonio high school student's challenge to the Gun-Free School Zones Act of 1990 (part of the Crime Control Act of 1990), which banned possession of handguns within  of a school. In a majority decision joined by four other justices, Chief Justice William Rehnquist held that Lopez' possession of the gun was not economic activity and its scope was not sufficiently cabined, and so was outside the broad reach of the Commerce Clause. After the Lopez decision, the Gun-Free School Zones Act of 1990 was amended to specifically only apply to guns that had been moved via interstate or foreign commerce.

In his dissent, Associate Justice Stephen Breyer argued that Congress could regulate handgun possession under the Commerce Clause because gun violence could have a significant effect on interstate commerce by impairing educational environments.

Though it did not reverse any past ruling about the meaning of the Commerce Clause, Lopez raised serious questions as to how far the Court might be willing to go in curbing Congress' powers under the Commerce Clause. The Court would later further limit congressional powers under the Commerce Clause in United States v. Morrison (2000).

Background
Alfonso Lopez, Jr., was a 12th-grade student at Edison High School in San Antonio, Texas. On March 10, 1992, he carried a concealed .38 caliber revolver, along with five cartridges, into the school. The gun was not loaded; Lopez claimed that he was to deliver the weapon to another person, a service for which he would receive $44. School authorities received an anonymous tip that Lopez was carrying the weapon, to which Lopez admitted when confronted. The next day, he was charged with violating the federal Gun-Free School Zones Act of 1990 (the "Act"), .

Lopez moved to dismiss the indictment on the ground that §922(q) of the Act was "unconstitutional as it is beyond the power of Congress to legislate control over our public schools." The trial court denied the motion, ruling that §922(q) was "a constitutional exercise of Congress' well defined power to regulate activities in and affecting commerce, and the 'business' of elementary, middle and high schools...affects interstate commerce."

Lopez was tried and convicted. He appealed to the Fifth Circuit Court of Appeals, claiming that §922(q) exceeded Congress' power to legislate under the Commerce Clause. The Fifth Circuit agreed and reversed his conviction, holding that "section 922(q), in the full reach of its terms, is invalid as beyond the power of Congress under the Commerce Clause." The Court of Appeals noted that the legislative history of the Act did not justify it as an exercise of the Commerce Clause power of Congress, suggesting that a new version of the Act which recited more of a nexus with interstate commerce might be devised, although what that nexus might be, is difficult to harmonize with the text of the decision, as the Court clearly stated that the situation posed only a "trivial impact" upon commerce.
Justice Harlan's claim of non-triviality was made despite the contention in Wickard v. Filburn stemming from an alleged alteration of national wheat prices caused by harvesting an excess 239 bushels of wheat grown as feed for livestock; relative to 941,970 bushels of wheat produced domestically in 1941.

The United States government filed a petition for certiorari, whereby the Court has discretion to hear or to decline a particular case, for Supreme Court review and the Court accepted the case.

To sustain the Act, the government was obligated to show that §922(q) was a valid exercise of the Congressional Commerce Clause power, i.e. that the section regulated a matter which "affected" (or "substantially affected") interstate commerce.

The government's principal argument was that the possession of a firearm in an educational environment would most likely lead to a violent crime, which in turn would affect the general economic condition in two ways. First, because violent crime causes harm and creates expense, it raises insurance costs, which are spread throughout the economy; and second, by limiting the willingness to travel in the area perceived to be unsafe. The government also argued that the presence of firearms within a school would be seen as dangerous, resulting in students' being scared and disturbed; this would, in turn, inhibit learning; and this, in turn, would lead to a weaker national economy since education is clearly a crucial element of the nation's financial health.

Supreme Court decision
In a 5–4 decision, the Supreme Court affirmed the decision of the Court of Appeals. It held that while Congress had broad lawmaking authority under the Commerce Clause, the power was limited, and did not extend so far from "commerce" as to authorize the regulation of the carrying of handguns, of aggregate effect.

Chief Justice Rehnquist, delivering the opinion of the Court, identified the three broad categories of activity that Congress could regulate under the Commerce Clause:

 The use of channels of interstate commerce
 The instrumentalities of interstate commerce, or persons or things in interstate commerce, even though the threat may come only from intrastate activities
 Activities that substantially affect or substantially relate to interstate commerce

He said they had summarily dismissed any consideration of the first two categories and concluded that the resolution of the case depended only on consideration of the third category—regulation of activities that substantially affect interstate commerce. The Court essentially concluded that in no way was the carrying of handguns a commercial activity or even related to any sort of economic enterprise, even under the most extravagant definitions.

The opinion rejected the government's argument that because crime negatively impacted education, Congress might have reasonably concluded that crime in schools substantially affects commerce.

The Court reasoned that if Congress could regulate something so far removed from commerce, then it could regulate anything, and since the Constitution clearly creates Congress as a body with enumerated powers, this could not be so. Rehnquist concluded:

The Court specifically looked to four factors in determining whether legislation represents a valid effort to use the Commerce Clause power to regulate activities that substantially affect interstate commerce:

Whether the activity was non-economic as opposed to economic activity; previous cases involved economic activity
Jurisdictional element: whether the gun had moved in interstate commerce
Whether there had been congressional findings of an economic link between guns and education
How attenuated the link was between the regulated activity and interstate commerce

Although the ruling stopped a decades-long trend of inclusiveness under the commerce clause, it did not reverse any past ruling about the meaning of the clause. Later, Rehnquist stated that the Court had the duty to prevent the legislative branch from usurping state powers over policing the conduct of their citizens. He admitted that the Supreme Court had upheld certain governmental steps towards taking power away from the states, and cited Lopez as a decision that finally stepped in to check the government's authority by defining clearly between state and federal powers.

Justice Thomas filed a separate concurring opinion. In it, Thomas describes the importance of maintaining the traditional sense of the word "commerce" as it appears in the Constitution: "...interjecting a modern sense of commerce into the Constitution generates significant textual and structural problems. For example, one cannot replace 'commerce' with a different type of enterprise, such as manufacturing..." Furthermore, Justice Thomas calls for further reevaluation of the "substantial effects" test, arguing that under the Court's understanding, it would allow for Congress to control every aspect of national life:

Dissenting opinions

Justice Breyer authored the principal dissenting opinion. He applied three principles that he considered basic:

The Commerce Clause included the power to regulate local activities so long as those "significantly affect" interstate commerce.
In considering the question, a court must consider not the individual act being regulated (a single instance of gun possession), but rather the cumulative effect of all similar acts (i.e., the effect of all guns possessed in or near schools).
A court must specifically determine not whether the regulated activity significantly affected interstate commerce, but whether Congress could have had a "rational basis" for so concluding.

With these principles in mind, Justice Breyer asked if Congress could have rationally found that the adverse effect of violent crime in school zones, acting through the intermediary effect of degrading the quality of education, could significantly affect interstate commerce. Based on the existence of empirical studies, he answered this question affirmatively. He pointed out the growing importance of education in the job market, noting that increased global competition made primary and secondary education more important. He also observed that US firms make location decisions, in part, on the presence or absence of an educated work force.

Justice Breyer concluded that it was obvious that gun violence could have an effect on interstate commerce. The only question remaining, then, was whether Congress could have rationally concluded that the effect could be "substantial." Congress could have rationally concluded, in Justice Breyer's judgment, that the linkage from gun violence to an impaired learning environment, and from this impaired environment to the consequent adverse economic effects, was sufficient to create a risk to interstate commerce that was "substantial."

Congress, in Justice Breyer's view, had a rational basis "for finding a significant connection between guns in or near schools and (through their effect on education) the interstate and foreign commerce they threaten." In his opinion, no more than this was required to find sufficient supporting power for the challenged law under the Commerce Clause, and he consequently believed that the Court of Appeals had erred and should be reversed.

In his dissent, Justice Souter warned that the distinction between "commercial" and "non-commercial" activity was not tenable. He echoed the "rational basis" theme of the Breyer dissent.

Justice Stevens, in his dissent, iterated his agreement with the Breyer dissent that found ample congressional power under the Commerce Clause to regulate the possession of firearms in schools, in the same way that Congress may act to protect the school environment from alcohol or asbestos. He also agreed with Justice Souter's "exposition of the radical character of the Court's holding and its kinship with the discredited, pre-Depression version of substantive due process."

Aftermath 
Lopez was the first case since 1937 in which the Court held that Congress had exceeded its power to legislate under the Commerce Clause. It raised serious questions as to how far the Court might be willing to go in implementing judicial safeguards against federal encroachments on state sovereignty. The precedent takes special significance in cases that the federal government attempts to limit private conduct. The decision sparked a lot of commentary focused on federalism. For instance, Lawrence Lessig praised the decision as a revival of federalism jurisprudence. The argument can be made that the significant limiting of federal power is necessary to establish a greater threshold for governmental accountability and revitalizes the role of the states in public policymaking. It can also be ascribed to new legislation that makes open carry in schools legal in some Texas jurisdictions.

The case has been followed by the Supreme Court in limiting Congress' power under the Commerce Clause in a 1999 case, United States v. Morrison, and under other enumerated powers in a 2001 case, Solid Waste Agency of Northern Cook County v. United States Army Corps of Engineers ("SWANCC").

Lopez joined the Marines after his conviction was overturned.

Revision and re-enactment of law 
Following the Lopez decision, Congress rewrote the Gun Free School Zones Act of 1990 in June 1995 with the necessary interstate-commerce "hook" used in other Federal Gun Laws. This includes an added requirement for prosecutors to prove during each prosecution case that the gun moved in or affected interstate or foreign commerce. The revised Federal Gun Free School Zones Act is currently in effect and has been upheld by several United States Appellate Courts. None of the convictions occurring under the revised law have been overturned as a result of the Lopez decision.

See also
 List of United States Supreme Court cases, volume 514
 List of United States Supreme Court cases
 Lists of United States Supreme Court cases by volume
 List of United States Supreme Court cases by the Rehnquist Court
 Wickard v. Filburn, 317 U.S. 111 (1942)
 A.L.A. Schechter Poultry Corp. v. United States, 295 U.S. 495 (1935)

References

External links

Case Brief for United States v. Lopez at Lawnix.com
"A GUN BAN IS SHOT DOWN" Time Magazine

United States Constitution Article One case law
United States Commerce Clause case law
United States Supreme Court cases
United States Supreme Court cases of the Rehnquist Court
1995 in United States case law
United States federal firearms case law
Education in San Antonio